Their Finest Collection is a compilation album by American country duo The Judds. It was released in 1991 and 1993 via the Curb and Dino record labels. The album was the duo's third compilation release issued in their career. It was also their first compilation issued to international markets in Europe and Australia.

Background and release
Their Finest Collection consisted of previously recorded material by The Judds during their career in the 1980s. The album contained songs first produced by Brent Maher. The same year of the album's release, Naomi Judd announced her retirement from the duo after being diagnosed with Hepatitis C. Their final studio album was released the previous year. The album contained a total of 16 tracks, 15 of which had previously been released as singles. Of the singles, 14 of them had been number one hits for the duo. This included "Mama He's Crazy," "Why Not Me" and "Rockin' with the Rhythm of the Rain."

Their Finest Collection was first released On November 2, 1991, but only to international markets outside their home market, the United States. It was released in Australia as both a vinyl LP and a compact disc. It was also released to markets in The Netherlands the same year. In 1993, the album was introduced to the German market. The album charted on one major publication. In The Netherlands, it reached number 61 on their albums chart.

Track listing

Compact disc versions

Cassette and LP versions

Chart performance

Personnel
All credits are adapted from the liner notes of Collector's Series.

Musical and technical personnel
 The Judds – lead vocals, harmony vocals
 Brent Maher – producer

Release history

References

1991 compilation albums
Curb Records compilation albums
The Judds compilation albums